Malloch is a surname. Notable people with the name include:

 Curtis Malloch ( 2010s), Canadian politician
 Douglas Malloch (1877–1938), American poet, writer and editor 
 Edward Malloch (1801–1867), Canadian merchant and politician 
 Elizabeth Malloch (1910–2000), Scottish educator and priest 
 Gavin Malloch (1905–1974), Scottish footballer 
 Jack Malloch (1920–1982), Rhodesian aircraft pilot
 Jock Malloch (1877–1935), Scottish footballer 
 John Russell Malloch (1875–1963), Scottish entomologist
 Jordan Malloch (born 1978), American sprint canoer
 Kathy Malloch, American nursing scholar
 Katie Malloch, Canadian broadcaster
 Lance Malloch-Brown (born 1979), Zimbabwean cricketer
 Mark Malloch Brown, Baron Malloch-Brown (born 1953), British politician and journalist
 Ted Malloch (born 1952), American author and consultant